Rebecca St. James is the second album by then-teenage Christian pop rock artist Rebecca St. James. It was released on 24 January 1994 by ForeFront Records. This is the only album by St. James that was produced by Bill Deaton. KLOVE said that the album "featured hit singles 'Here I Am' and 'Side by Side'".

Track listing

Personnel 
 Rebecca St. James – lead vocals
 Blair Masters – keyboards, arrangements (10)
 Dann Huff – guitars
 Tommy Sims – bass 
 Chester Thompson – drums 
 Eric Darken – tambourine (5)
 Bill Deaton – arrangements (10)
 Bob Carlisle – backing vocals 
 Chris Eaton – backing vocals 
 Kim Fleming – backing vocals 
 Lisa Cochran – backing vocals 
 Amy Joy – backing vocals 
 Children's choir (4) – Juli Brazzell, Stephanie Brooks, Megan Dockery, Emily Estes, Rachel Howell and Jeanette Taylor
 Norm Branstromm – vocal coach

Production
 Bill Deaton – producer, engineer, mixing
 Brown Bannister – executive producer
 Pete Martinez – assistant engineer
 Shawn McLean – assistant engineer
 Carry Summers – assistant engineer
 Recorded at 
 The Bennett House, Franklin, Tennessee – recording location
 OmniSound Studios, Nashville, Tennessee – recording location
 Audio Impact, London, UK – recording location
 Sixteenth Avenue Sound, Nashville, Tennessee – mixing location
 Doug Sax – mastering at The Mastering Lab, Hollywood, California
 Sharon Anderson - art direction and design
 Susan DeGarmo – art direction and design
 Russ Harrington – photography 
 Claudia McConnell-Fowler – stylist
 Carol Maxwell – make-up

Chart performance
Billboard Contemporary Christian No. 33.

References 

1994 albums
ForeFront Records albums
Rebecca St. James albums